The Kawasaki Zephyr is a range of retro-styled naked superbikes made in the 1990s in Kawasaki's Z series. All models have transverse air-cooled dual overhead camshaft inline-four engines. There were a number of Zephyr models, in four engine capacities, .

The 400 was produced for the Japan market starting in 1989.

Zephyr styling is roughly based on the old Kawasaki Z1, with twin shock rear suspension, a relatively upright riding position and air-cooled power units. The 400, 550 and 750 engines were developed from the old Z400/500/550/650/750/900 series. The 1100 engine is based on the air-cooled DOHC, eight-valve inline-four that traces its roots back through the GPz1100 to the Z1000. It is the only Zephyr built with two spark plugs per cylinder.  

The Zephyr started the naked/retro bike boom in the UK and Europe in the early 1990s and for a while moved Kawasaki to the 2nd best selling manufacturer of motorcycles in the UK Market.

The Zephyr Z750 engine reappeared in the late 1990s in the short lived ZR7.

The Zephyr 1100 had a Z1 restyle in its last year of sale including a return to wire wheels. Wire wheels also appeared on the 750. It was replaced in the Kawasaki UK range by the popular Z1100R styled Kawasaki ZRX1100 (1997–2005).

The ZRX series of motorcycles had a great impact on the growing market for retro style motorcycles, particularly in the United States. It was modeled after Kawasaki's superbike championship winning KZ1000R-S1 that propelled Eddie Lawson to Superbike dominance in the early 1980s.

References

Zephyr
Standard motorcycles